Leslie West Live! is a live album by Leslie West, released in 1993. The album features a track from West's debut solo album, Mountain, four tracks recorded by Mountain and one by West, Bruce and Laing. Additionally, apart from the "Intro Guitar Solo", there are two previously unreleased tracks, Jimi Hendrix's "Voodoo Chile" and Don Nix's "Goin' Down".

Track listing
 "Intro Guitar Solo"  1.34
 "Never in My Life"  5.53
 "Theme for an Imaginary Western"  6.50
 "Third Degree"  7.46
 "Voodoo Chile"  6.58
 "Goin' Down"  4.46
 "Baby I'm Down"  1.36
 "Nantucket Sleighride"  7.31
 "Mississippi Queen"  6.02

Personnel
Leslie West – vocals, guitar
Richie Scarlet – bass guitar
Paul Beretta – drums

References

Leslie West albums
1993 live albums